is a Japanese voice actor affiliated with Genki Project.

Voice roles

Television animation
Beyblade Burst Chōzetsu (Kyle Hakim)
Bleach (Zennosuke Kurumadani)
Brave Command Dagwon (Hido)
Fruits Basket (2001) (Cousin, First Year Boy Student 1, Disciple, Teacher 2, Male Student, Head Chef, Momiji's Company Secretary, Man 1, Man B)
Gantz (Jōichirō Nishi)
Kaitou Joker (DJ Peacock)
Negima! Magister Negi Magi (Albert Camomile (Kamo-kun))
Negima!? (Kamo-kun)
Net Ghost PiPoPa (Pat, Jin Kazama)
Nurarihyon no Mago (Kappa)
Samurai Champloo (Tomonoshin Shibui)
Sket Dance (Hōsuke)
Ushio to Tora (Kyōma)
Yo-kai Watch (Wiglin, Happierre)
Yo-kai Watch Shadowside (Charlie, Atshushi Kamamoto, Blazion, Wakume-Kun)

Tokusatsu
Ressha Sentai ToQger (Wig Shadow)

References

External links
 

1970 births
Living people
Japanese male voice actors
Male voice actors from Saitama Prefecture